Vishvendra Singh (born 23 June 1962) is an Indian politician. He is currently Cabinet minister in Rajasthan Government, Tourism and Civil Aviation Department.  He belongs to the Indian National Congress. Before 2008, he has been associated with Bhartiya Janta Party and Janata Dal.  Singh joined the congress in 2008 over conflict with his party colleague Digamber Singh. Vishvendra being a royal always had political leverage, however his defeat to Digamber Singh in 2008, reduced his political stature, making Digamber the leader of Jats in Rajasthan.

He Served As the Minister of Tourism and Devasthan Department In Rajasthan Government.  He is Member of the Legislative Assembly (MLA) from Deeg-Kumher Constituency in Bharatpur district of Eastern Rajasthan. He is a three time Member of Parliament, Lok Sabha representing Bharatpur, Rajasthan. In 2018, he became a member of the cabinet of the Third Gehlot ministry. However, his term was terminated a year later in 2019, over disputes within the part.

He is the son of the last ruler of the princely state of Bharatpur.

In the 26th amendment to the Constitution of India promulgated in 1971, the Government of India abolished all official symbols of princely India, including titles, privileges, and remuneration (privy purses). Currently he is member of legislative assembly of Rajasthan from Deeg Kumher legislative region.

Rajasthan Legislative Assembly

Lok Sabha

References

External links
 Official biographical sketch in Parliament of India website

1962 births
Living people
Indian National Congress
Rajasthani politicians
India MPs 2004–2009
People from Bharatpur, Rajasthan
Lok Sabha members from Rajasthan
India MPs 1989–1991
Bharatiya Janata Party politicians from Rajasthan
India MPs 1999–2004
Janata Dal politicians
Jat